Crew is a townland lying within the civil parish of Maghera, County Londonderry, Northern Ireland. It lies in the east-centre of the parish on the north boundary of the civil parish of Termoneeny, and is bounded by the townlands of Ballymacilcurr, Culnady, Curragh, Moneymore, Mullagh, Tamnymartin, and Tamnymullan. It wasn't apportioned to any of the London livery companies, being kept as church lands.

The townland in 1926 was part of Upperland district electoral division as part of Magherafelt Rural District. As part of Maghera civil parish, Crew also lies within the historic barony of Loughinsholin.

References

Townlands of County Londonderry
Civil parish of Maghera